The Northeast Women's Hockey League is an NCAA Division III women's ice hockey conference. The conference was formed in 2017 when the ECAC West collapsed and the women's ice hockey programs of the five schools whose primary conference was the State University of New York Athletic Conference (SUNYAC) banded together to form the NEWHL. While SUNYAC supports men's ice hockey, only five of the ten member schools sponsor women's ice hockey.

Members
The NEWHL was formed by five schools in 2017 and was joined by two more beginning with the 2019–20 season. Because seven teams is the minimum requirement for a conference to receive an automatic bid for the NCAA Championship Tournament, the stability of the NEWHL was greatly strengthened with the additions.

Current members

Membership timeline

References

External links
 NEWHL homepage

NCAA Division III ice hockey conferences
Organizations established in 2017
Women's ice hockey